Joanne Mitchell (born 30 July 1971) is an English film, stage and TV actress. In 2011 she co-founded Mitchell Brunt Films with husband and Emmerdale colleague Dominic Brunt and has worked as producer/writer on several of the company's films.

Career
Mitchell trained at The Bristol Old Vic Theatre School, where she met future husband Dominic Brunt. After graduating she embarked on a varied career in theatre and TV, including four roles in TV soap Emmerdale. Mitchell's theatrical roles have included Macbeth's Lady McDuff, Hermia in A Midsummer Night's Dream and Rosaline in Love's Labours Lost. She has also played Valerie in Conor McPherson's The Weir and Jenny in Alan Ayckbourn's Family Circles.

Since forming Mitchell-Brunt Films, Mitchell has expressed a desire to push boundaries and to merge drama and horror in unique ways. She wrote and produced two short horror films The Mighty Witch Killers of Pendle Hill and Shell Shocked. She then co-starred in the claustrophobic chiller White Settlers (2014) and the Manchester-set Habit (2016). She conceived, produced and starred in the zombie drama Before Dawn (2013) and 'female revenge' thriller Bait (2015).

Emmerdale
Mitchell has had four roles in Emmerdale. Her first in the long-running rural soap was in 2003, when she played DS Karen Barnborough in two episodes. She had further roles as Midwife Yeo and Susan Davies and, in 2016, took over the role of Sandra Flaherty.

Filmography

References

External links
 Mitchell-Brunt Films website
 
 Mitchell-Brunt Films at BFI

British actresses
Living people
1971 births